The Kern County Fire Department (KCFD) provides fire protection and emergency response services for the unincorporated areas of Kern County, California, and for multiple cities within the county.

In addition to the unincorporated areas of Kern County, the department also services the cities of Arvin, Delano, Maricopa, McFarland, Ridgecrest, Shafter, Taft, Tehachapi and Wasco.

Equipment

Helicopters
The KCFD has two helicopters in their air operations unit, H-407 and H-408. Both are Bell UH-1 "Huey"s and are fitted for both hoisting of personnel for a rescue as well as for dropping of water during a fire.  The underside can also be fitted with water dropping tanks that carry 320 gallons of water and have the ability to pump water from a reservoir or other water source or they can be filled on the ground with fire hoses.

Emergency operations

Battalion 1 - Central Mountains/Desert
Battalion 1 comprises the southeastern portion of Kern County. It is divided by Highway 58 that runs east and west and by Highway 14 that runs north and south. A portion of the California Aqueduct, which runs north and south, serves as the eastern boundary of the State Responsibility Area (SRA) for Battalion 1. The western edge of the SRA in Battalion 1 is established by the southeastern edge of the San Joaquin Valley. Battalion one provides fire protection services for the incorporated cities of Tehachapi, Arvin and Rosamond. Station 11 in Keene serves as HQ for Battalion 1. There is also Stations 12,13,14,15,16,17,18 and a Camp station.
Stations
11:  Keene (Battalion 1 HQ)
12:  Tehachapi
13:  Golden Hills
14:  Mojave
15:  Rosamond
16:  Bear Valley
17:  Boron
18:  Stallion Springs
Camp 8: Monolith

Battalion 2 - Western Kern
Battalion 2 makes up most of the west side of the County of Kern, specifically areas west of Highway 33 and the area surrounding Highway 166. There are no large incorporated cities within Battalion 2. Station 21 in Taft serves as Battalion 2 HQ. There is also Stations 22,23,24,25 and 26.
Stations
21:  Taft (Battalion 2 HQ)
22:  Maricopa
23:  Fellows
24:  McKittrick
25:  Buttonwillow
26:  Lost Hills

Battalion 3 - North Kern

Battalion 3 includes the north central portion of the county with Highway 65 serving as the western boundary. Station 33 in McFarland serves as Battalion 3 HQ and there is also Stations 31,32,34,35,36 and 37.
Stations
31:  Wasco
32:  Shafter
33:  McFarland (Battalion 3 HQ)
34:  Delano
35:  Woody
36:  Glennvile
37:  Delano West

Battalion 4 - Foothill
Battalion 4 comprises the unincorporated parts of Bakersfield to the East and South. Station 41 in Virginia Colony serves as Battalion 4 HQ. There is also Stations 42,45,51,52 and 53. 
Stations
41:  Virginia Colony (Battalion 4 HQ)
42:  Niles
45:  Edison
51:  Lamont
52:  Greenfiled
53:  Old River

Battalion 5 - Mt. Pinos

Battalion 5 is located in the South and South West portion of the County bordering Los Angeles County and Ventura County. Included in Battalion 5's coverage area are the cities of Lebec, Frazier Park, Lake of the Woods, Pinion Pines and Pine Mountain Club. Station 55 in Tejon Ranch serves as Battalion 5 HQ and there is also Stations 54,56,57 and 58.
Stations
54:  Arvin
55: Tejon Ranch (Battalion 5 HQ)
56:  Lebec
57:  Frazier Park
58:  Pine Mountain Club

Battalion 6 - Valley Metro
Stations
61:  Norris 
62:  Meadows Field
63:  Highland
64:  River View
65:  Greenacres (Battalion 6 HQ)
66:  Landco
67:  Rosedale

Battalion 7 - Eastern Kern 
Battalion 7 is located in the northeast portion of the county. Within the coverage area are the towns of Havilah, Lake Isabella, Bodfish, Wofford Heights, Kernville, Randsburg, and incorporated city of Ridgecrest, California.
Stations
71:  South Lake (Battalion 7 HQ)
72:  Lake Isabella
73:  Inyokern
74:  Ridgecrest
75:  Randsburg
76:  Kernville
77:  Ridgecrest Heights
78:  Piute
79:  Alta Sierra (Seasonal)

Rank structure

Fire Chief & Director of Emergency Services
Chief Deputy
Deputy Chief
Division Chief
Battalion Chief / Fire Marshal / Arson Chief
Captain / Assistant Fire Marshal / Arson Investigator
Engineer
Firefighter

See also 
Bakersfield Fire Department

References

County government agencies in California
Fire departments in California
Government of Kern County, California